Brown beech is a common name for several plants and may refer to:

Cryptocarya glaucescens
Pennantia cunninghamii

Brown beech is also a common name for a mushroom native to East Asia:
Hypsizygus tessellatus